The Oman Medical Journal is a bimonthly open access peer-reviewed medical journal. It was established in 1984 and published by the Oman Medical Specialty Board. At the start of 2020, Oman Medical Journal transitioned from a print-publication to an electronic-only publication.

Content 
The journal publishes different types of articles from various medical disciplines:
Editorial
Review article
Original article
Case report
Brief communications 
Clinical quiz
Clinical notes
Letters to the Editor

Continuing medical education credits 
The Oman Medical Specialty Board awards continuing medical education credits to authors and reviewers of the Oman Medical Journal.

Abstracting and indexing 
The journal is listed in PubMed and PubMed Central, and indexed in Index Medicus for the Eastern Mediterranean Region, Google Scholar, CrossRef, Index Copernicus, CINAHL, DOAJ, Global Health, Academic OneFile, Academic Science in Context, Academic Journals Database, CAB Abstracts, CABI Publishing, Chemical Abstracts, Cornell University Library, EBSCO Publishing Electronic Database, Embase, Electronic Journals Library (EZB), Expanded Academic ASAP, Genamics JournalSeek, Gale and Open J-Gate, GFMER, Health Reference Center, ICMJE, Newjour, SCIRUS, SCImago Journal & Country Rank, Scopus, Summon by Serial Solution, The John Rylands Library, and UlrichsWeb Directory.

References

External links 
 

General medical journals
Publications established in 1984
English-language journals
Open access journals
Bimonthly journals
Health in Oman